Jarmo Mäkitalo (born 8 October 1960) is a Finnish ice hockey player. He competed in the men's tournaments at the 1980 Winter Olympics and the 1984 Winter Olympics. Mäkitalo settled in Sweden after his playing career.

Career statistics

Regular season and playoffs

International

References

1960 births
Living people
Finnish ice hockey players
Olympic ice hockey players of Finland
Ice hockey players at the 1980 Winter Olympics
Ice hockey players at the 1984 Winter Olympics
Sportspeople from Lahti
Finnish expatriate sportspeople in Sweden